Haida Nation v British Columbia (Minister of Forests), [2004] 3 S.C.R. 511 is the leading decision of the Supreme Court of Canada on the Crown duty to consult Aboriginal groups prior to exploiting lands to which they may have claims.

Background
In 1961, the provincial government of British Columbia issued a "Tree Farm Licence" (TFL 39) over an area of land to which the Haida Nation claimed title. This title had not yet been recognized at law. The Haida Nation also claimed an Aboriginal right to harvest red cedar in that area. In 1981, 1995, and 2000 the Minister replaced TFL 39; in 1999 the Minister authorized a transfer to Weyerhauser Co. These actions were performed unilaterally, without consent from or consultation with the Haida Nation. The Haida Nation brought a suit, requesting that the replacement and transfer be set aside.

The chambers judge found that the Crown was under a moral – but not legal – duty to negotiate with the Haida Nation. The British Columbia Court of Appeal reversed this decision, deciding that both the Crown and Weyerhauser Co. are under legal obligations to consult with Aboriginal groups whose interests may be affected.

Judgment of the Court

Chief Justice McLachlin, writing for a unanimous court, found that the Crown has a "duty to consult with Aboriginal peoples and accommodate their interests". This duty is grounded in the honour of the Crown, and applies even where title has not been proven. The scope of this duty will vary with the circumstances; the duty will escalate proportionately to the strength of the claim for a right or title and the seriousness of the potential effect upon the claimed right or title. However, regardless of what the scope of the duty is determined to be, consultation must always be meaningful.

Where there is a strong prima facie case for the claim and the adverse effects of the government's proposed actions impact it in a significant (and adverse) way, the government may be required to accommodate. This may require taking steps to avoid irreparable harm or minimize the effects of the infringement.

Both sides are required to act in good faith throughout the process. The Crown must intend to substantially address the concerns of the Aboriginal group through meaningful consultation, and the Aboriginal group must not attempt to frustrate that effort or take unreasonable positions to thwart it.

On the facts of the case, the Court found that the Haida Nation's claims of title and an Aboriginal right were strong, and that the government's actions could have a serious impact on the claimed right and title. Accordingly, the Crown had a duty to consult the Haida Nation, and likely had a duty to accommodate their interests.

The Crown's duty of good-faith consultation does not extend to third parties, and cannot be delegated to them by the Crown. This is not to say that third parties cannot be liable to Aboriginal groups in negligence, or for dealing with them dishonestly. However, it does mean that the legal obligation of consultation and accommodation is shouldered exclusively by the Crown.

Accordingly, the Crown's appeal was dismissed and Weyerhauser Co.'s appeal was allowed.

References

Further reading 

 Aboriginal land title in Canada

External links
Full text of Supreme Court decision from canlii.org

Supreme Court of Canada cases
2004 in Canadian case law
2004 in the environment
Weyerhaeuser
Haida
Canadian Aboriginal case law
Indigenous peoples and the environment